Microthyris anormalis is a moth in the family Crambidae. It was described by Achille Guenée in 1854. It is found in French Guiana, Colombia, Ecuador, the Dominican Republic, Jamaica, Honduras, Panama, Costa Rica and the United States, where it has been recorded from Florida and Texas.

Host plants
This species feeds on Convolvulaceae, in Cuba it was recorded on Ipomoea batatas and Turbina corymbosa.

References

Moths described in 1854
Spilomelinae